Roger D. Freeman (November 30, 1965 – October 29, 2014) was an American lawyer and politician of the Democratic Party. He was a member of the Washington House of Representatives, representing the 30th Legislative District. He died in office of colon cancer, but was subsequently re-elected posthumously. Freeman was African-American.

References

1965 births
2014 deaths
People from Federal Way, Washington
Iowa State University alumni
Washburn University alumni
Washington (state) city council members
Democratic Party members of the Washington House of Representatives
Washington (state) lawyers
Deaths from cancer in Washington (state)
Deaths from colorectal cancer
Politicians elected posthumously
African-American state legislators in Washington (state)
20th-century American lawyers
20th-century African-American people
21st-century African-American people